Wagoner County is a county located in the U.S. state of Oklahoma. As of the 2020 census, the population was 80,981. Its county seat is Wagoner.

Wagoner County is included in the Tulsa metropolitan statistical area.

History
According to archaeological studies, this area was inhabited by Caddoan Mound Builders during 300 to 1200 AD.

The western area of Wagoner County was settled by the Creek after their forced removal in Alabama in the 1820s.   The eastern portion of the county was settled by the Cherokee.

During the Civil War in 1865, the present county was the scene of the Battle of Flat Rock (also known as the Hay Camp Action).  Confederate troops led by Brig. General Stand Watie and Brig. General Richard Gano captured 85 Union troops and killed even more who were harvesting hay.

In 1905, the Sequoyah Convention proposed creating two counties from this area. The western half would be named Coweta and the eastern half would have been named Tumechichee. However, failure of the attempt to create the state of Sequoyah negated the proposal. In 1907 at Oklahoma statehood, Wagoner County was organized. The towns of Porter and Coweta  vied with Wagoner as the county seat.  The county was named after the town of Wagoner, which won the election. The town was named after Henry "Bigfoot" Wagoner, a Katy Railroad dispatcher from Parsons, Kansas.

Geography
It is part of the Ozark Highlands. The Verdigris River divides the east and west parts of the county. The Arkansas River forms part of the western and southern boundaries. Grand River also flows south through the county. It was dammed in 1942 to create Fort Gibson Lake.

Adjacent counties
 Rogers County (northwest)
 Mayes County (northeast)
 Cherokee County (east)
 Muskogee County (south)
 Tulsa County (west)

Demographics

As of the census of 2010, 73,085 people were in the county.  The population density was 47.7/km2.  The 29,694 housing units averaged 55.9/sq mi (19.4/km2).  The racial makeup of the county was 80.07% White, 3.75% African American, 9.38% Native American, 0.51% Asian, 0.88% from other races, and 5.41% from two or more races.  Hispanics or Latinos of any race were 2.50% of the population.

Of the 21,010 households, 37.40% had children under 18 living with them, 65.90% were married couples living together, 9.80% had a female householder with no husband present, and 20.50% were not families. About 17.70% of all households were made up of individuals, and 6.70% had someone living alone who was 65 or older.  The average household size was 2.73, and the average family size was 3.08.

In the county, the age distribution was 28.10% under 18, 7.90% from 18 to 24, 28.50% from 25 to 44, 25.40% from 45 to 64, and 10.20% who were 65 age or older.  The median age was 36 years. For every 100 females, there were 97.70 males.  For every 100 females age 18 and over, there were 94.90 males.

The median income for a household in the county was $56,819, and for a family was $62,997. The per capita income for the county was $24,976. About 8.3% of families and 12.1% of the population were below the poverty line, including 18.5% of those under age 18 and 5.8% of those age 65 or over.

Politics

Communities

Cities

 Bixby
 Broken Arrow
 Catoosa
 Coweta
 Tulsa
 Wagoner (county seat)

Towns

 Fair Oaks
 Okay
 Porter
 Redbird
 Tullahassee

Census-designated places

 Clarksville
 Mallard Bay
 Rocky Point
 Taylor Ferry
 Toppers
 Whitehorn Cove

Other unincorporated places

 Choska
 Gibson
 Neodesha
 Oneta
 Stones Corner

Former community
 New Tulsa, dissolved in 2001, now part of Broken Arrow

Education
School districts (all full K-12) include:

 Bixby Public Schools
 Broken Arrow Public Schools
 Catoosa Public Schools
 Chouteau-Mazie Public Schools
 Coweta Public Schools
 Fort Gibson Public Schools
 Haskell Public Schools
 Inola Public Schools
 Locust Grove Public Schools
 Okay Public Schools
 Porter Consolidated Schools
 Tulsa Public Schools
 Wagoner Public Schools

National Register of Historic Places

 
These in Wagoner County are listed on the National Register of Historic Places:

References

 
Tulsa metropolitan area
1907 establishments in Oklahoma
Populated places established in 1907